Some official place names in New Zealand are dual names, usually incorporating both the Māori place name and the original name given by European settlers or explorers. Although a mixture of Māori and English names is the most common form of dual name, some places, such as Mahināpua Creek / Tūwharewhare, include Māori elements in each part of the name, and Wellington Harbour (Port Nicholson) incorporates two English names. One name, Port Levy (Potiriwi) / Koukourarata, has a triple name consisting of the Māori name, the European name, and a Māori transliteration of the latter. 

The practice of giving certain New Zealand places dual names began in the 1920s, but dual names became much more common in the 1990s and 2000s, in part due to Treaty of Waitangi settlements. Many places have names with a long heritage in each culture. For instance, one settlement saw Cloudy Bay, given this name by Captain Cook in 1770, renamed Te Koko-o-Kupe / Cloudy Bay, with the Māori name recalling the early explorer Kupe scooping up oysters from the bay.

Uncommonly, a place may be given two alternative names instead of one dual name. Prominent examples include the North Island and Te Ika-a-Māui, the South Island and Te Waipounamu, and the town called Whanganui or Wanganui. These places are not included in the list below.

Assignment and status

Official place names in New Zealand are usually determined by the New Zealand Geographic Board (Ngā Pou Taunaha o Aotearoa). In cases where there have been objections to a proposed name, a final decision is made by the Minister of Lands.

A large number of dual names have been conferred not by the NZGB, but were negotiated as part of Treaty of Waitangi claims settlements and then enacted by Parliament. The 1998 Ngāi Tahu settlement alone established 87 dual names, including Aoraki / Mount Cook.

Many New Zealand place names do not have official recognition by the NZGB, including most of New Zealand's major cities and, until 2013, both the North and South islands. Unofficial names are still recorded within the gazetteer, provided that they have "appeared in at least two publicly available authoritative publications or databases". In most cases, there is no functional difference between an official and unofficial name, with the NZGB expecting to standardise unofficial names as official by 2026.

Orthography

Originally, the board gazetted dual names in a form where the less commonly used name was in parentheses, e.g. Taylors Mistake (Te Onepoto). In the 1990s the system was changed to separating the names with a forward slash, viz., name1/name2, e.g. Aoraki/Mount Cook. Now, placing a space before and after the slash is encouraged, viz., name1 / name2. In 2021, the New Zealand Geographic Board voted to standardise the orthography of dual place names, and is in the process of updating names which use parentheses to the more common forward slash.

The board now generally puts the Māori name first, but exceptions are sometimes made, for example when maritime safety is paramount (e.g. Baring Head / Ōrua-pouanui).

List of official dual names

List of unofficial dual names

See also 

 List of New Zealand places named by James Cook

References

Lists of place names
Lists of places in New Zealand
New Zealand
New Zealand
Names of places in New Zealand
New Zealand